Xylodromus uralensis is a species of beetle in the rove beetle family that is endemic to Russia.

References 

Beetles described in 1936
Endemic fauna of Russia
Omaliinae